Reinstinden is a mountain in Lom Municipality in Innlandet county, Norway. The mountain is surrounded by several other notable mountains including Høgtunga to the south; Storådalshøi to the southwest; Hinnotefjellet, Semeltinden, and Søre Hellstugutinden to the west; Nestsøre Hellstugutinden, Store Hellstugutinden, and Nørdre Hellstugutinden to the northwest; Store Memurutinden and Austre Memurutinden to the north; Blåbreahøe to the northeast; and Surtningssue and Raudhamran to the east.

See also
List of mountains of Norway by height

References

Jotunheimen
Lom, Norway
Mountains of Innlandet